This is a list of all released Command & Conquer media with release dates.

Unless otherwise noted, information is referenced to related Wikipedia articles and MobyGames. Information about the soundtracks was received from iTunes Store.

Games

Video games

Other media

Collector's Editions

Smaller compilations

Larger compilations

Online Games
Pogo.com released two Command & Conquer online games, Command & Conquer: Attack Copter and Command & Conquer: Armored Attack, which are adventure games where you control a helicopter and tank respectively. You have different objectives in the missions, such as destroying buildings. It is based on Command & Conquer: Generals. Electronic Arts released MMO game Command and Conquer: Tiberium Alliances.

Soundtrack

Printed media

References 

Media
Media lists by video games franchise
Mass media by franchise